Thelymitra luteocilium, commonly called the fringed sun orchid, is a species of orchid that is endemic to south-eastern Australia. It has a single fleshy, dark green leaf and up to six pale pink to reddish flowers with a short wavy lobe on top of the column.

Description
The lobe on the top of the anther has a dense fringe and a yellow tip with a dark collar. The side lobes have dense, yellow, mop-like tufts on their ends. The flowers are self-pollinated and open only slowly on hot, humid days. Flowering occurs from August to October.

Taxonomy and naming
Thelymitra luteocilium was first formally described in 1882 by Robert Fitzgerald and the description was published in The Gardeners' Chronicle. The specific epithet (luteocilium) is derived from the Latin words luteus meaning "yellow" and cilium meaning "eyelash".

Distribution and habitat
The fringed sun orchid mostly grows near low shrubs in forest and scrubland in central-western Victoria and eastern South Australia.

References

External links
 
 

luteocilium
Endemic orchids of Australia
Orchids of New South Wales
Orchids of Victoria (Australia)
Orchids of Tasmania
Orchids of South Australia
Plants described in 1882